Mushroom Records was an Australian flagship record label, founded in 1972 in Melbourne. It published and distributed many successful Australian artists and expanded internationally, until it was merged with Festival Records in 1998. Festival Mushroom Records was later acquired by Warner Bros. Records, which operated the label from 2005 to 2010 until it folded to Warner Bros. Records. Founder Michael Gudinski went on to become the leader of the Mushroom Group, the  largest independent music and entertainment company in Australia, with divisions such as Frontier Touring.

History
Mushroom Records was an Australian record label formed by Michael Gudinski and Ray Evans in Melbourne in 1972. After its sale in 1998 along with Mushroom Distribution Services, they merged into Festival Mushroom Records. From 2005 to 2009, it was operated by Warner Bros. Records. Gudinski subsequently expanded a pre-existing label, Liberation Music, to release material by former Mushroom artists.

Its inaugural release was an ambitious triple live album of the 1973 Sunbury Pop Festival, and over the first few years of its existence Mushroom signed a number of important Australian acts including Madder Lake, Ayers Rock, and MacKenzie Theory. In December 1974, Gudinski flew to the US to promote his recording artists, with Ayers Rock securing a recording contract, and an advance from A&M Records. Ayers Rock were the first Mushroom artist to sign an international recording contract. Mushroom struggled to survive for its first two years and reportedly came close to folding on several occasions. However, the label was dramatically pushed to the forefront of the Australian music scene in early 1975 following the massive success of Skyhooks, whose debut album, Living in the 70's, became the biggest-selling Australian LP ever released up to that time.

Around the same time, Gudinski was convinced to sign expatriate New Zealand band Split Enz, who had recently relocated to Australia. Although they had only moderate success for the first few years, Split Enz scored huge success in 1980 with the release of their album True Colours and the hit single "I Got You", which marked the emergence of Neil Finn.

In 1978, Gudinski started Suicide Records, an alternative Mushroom label, to release Punk music.  Its first release was "These Boots Are Made For Walking" (cover version), by The Boys Next Door.

In 1981, Gudinski started White Label Records, an alternative Mushroom label, to release innovative music, with signings such as Hunters & Collectors, Machinations, Painters and Dockers, Kids in the Kitchen and The Stems.

In the 1990s, remixer Gavin Campbell's Razor Records became a subsidiary of Mushroom.

Mushroom entered the international scene by setting up an International division in London headed by Gary Ashley (deceased 2017). The Australian label had some international success before then by signing The Saints, Dannii Minogue, Kylie Minogue and Jason Donovan in the eighties. However the last two were released internationally through PWL. In the 1990s, Mushroom was reportedly in the front-running to sign rising new Australian band Silverchair, but the group opted to sign with Sony instead.

After selling 49% of the company to News Corporation in 1993, Garbage signed to the label via Koda Marshall's UK operation, followed by Pop Will Eat Itself, Ash, The Paradise Motel and Peter André.

Gudinski sold the remaining 51% share of the label to News Corporation in 1998 for a sum reported to have been around A$40 million. However, the sale of Australia's last major independent label to a multinational engendered some adverse publicity, with Gudinski controversially claiming that he had sold the label as a protest at the federal government's changes to the regulations governing the parallel importation of recordings.

Gudinski maintained control of most other Mushroom Group companies (including interests in music publishing, film production, band booking, national touring and venue management) and the name Mushroom Records. When Mushroom was merged with News Corporation's record label Festival Records to form Festival Mushroom Records in 1998, Gudinski relaunched Liberation Music.

In October 2005, Festival Mushroom Records was wound up and its trademarks and assets (including its large archive of master recordings) were sold to the Australian division of the Warner Music Group in a deal reported to be worth around A$10 million.

The company's other major asset, Festival Music Publishing, was sold to Gudinski's Mushroom Music a month later for an undisclosed sum.

In December 2009, Gudinski announced that he bought the remaining 50% he did not own from Warner Bros. In 2010, it became fully independent again.

In 2021, Gudinski died in Melbourne at the age of 68.

A&E Records
With the reorganisation into Festival Mushroom Records, a number of international operations and joint ventures were either shut down or sold. In the United Kingdom, the British arm of the company (including Infectious and Perfecto Records) was reorganised as A&E Records and sold on to the Warner Music Group when Korda Marshall took a position within that company.

Mushroom Records artists
Below are all the artists that were on the now non-existent label.

See also
 List of record labels
 Festival Mushroom Records
 List of Festival Mushroom Records artists
 Festival Records
 Warner Bros. Records
 Liberation Records
 A&E Records/Warner Music Group
 Infectious Records
 Perfecto Records
 Taste Media
 Mushroom 25 Live

References

External links
 Infectious Music
 Mushroom Records
 Mushroom Music Publishers
 

APRA Award winners
Record labels established in 1972
1972 establishments in Australia
Record labels disestablished in 2009
2009 disestablishments in Australia
Australian record labels
Pop record labels
Rock record labels
Record labels based in Melbourne